Wu Guangtang (1908–1985) was a People's Republic of China politician. He was born in Wuxiang County, Shanxi. He was vice-governor and CPPCC Committee Chairman of his home province.

1908 births
1985 deaths
People's Republic of China politicians from Shanxi
Chinese Communist Party politicians from Shanxi
CPPCC Committee Chairmen of Shanxi
Vice-governors of Shanxi
People from Wuxiang County
Politicians from Changzhi